Svängsta IF is a Swedish football club located in Svängsta.

Background
Svängsta IF currently plays in Division 4 Blekinge which is the sixth tier of Swedish football. They play their home matches at the Marieborg in Svängsta.

The club is affiliated to Blekinge Fotbollförbund. Svängsta IF have competed in the Svenska Cupen on 2 occasions.

Season to season

Footnotes

External links
 Svängsta IF – Official website
 Svängsta IF on Facebook

Football clubs in Blekinge County